Featherstone is a civil parish in the metropolitan borough of the City of Wakefield, West Yorkshire, England.  The parish contains 14 listed buildings that are recorded in the National Heritage List for England.  Of these, two are listed at Grade II*, the middle of the three grades, and the others are at Grade II, the lowest grade.  The parish contains the town of Featherstone and the surrounding area.  The listed buildings consist of houses, a former lodge, a bridge, and two churches, the churchyard of the older church containing a cross shaft and monuments that are listed.


Key

Buildings

References

Citations

Sources

 

Lists of listed buildings in West Yorkshire